The 1995 Redcar and Cleveland Borough Council election took place on 4 May 1995. The whole council was up for election as it was the first election since the formation of the Unitary Authority after replacing Langbaurgh Borough Council. The Labour Party won the most seats and took overall control of the council.

Election result

References

1995 English local elections
1995
1990s in North Yorkshire